Arthrocereus spinosissimus is a species of Arthrocereus from Brazil.

References

External links
 
 

spinosissimus
Flora of Brazil